Henry Stanford may refer to:

 Henry King Stanford (1916–2009), university president
 Henry Stanford (American football), American football coach